Andrew Harry (born 6 March 1968) is a Guyanese sprinter. He competed in the men's 4 × 400 metres relay at the 1996 Summer Olympics.

References

1968 births
Living people
Athletes (track and field) at the 1996 Summer Olympics
Guyanese male sprinters
Olympic athletes of Guyana
Place of birth missing (living people)